In linear algebra, a frame of an inner product space is a generalization of a basis of a vector space to sets that may be linearly dependent. In the terminology of signal processing, a frame provides a redundant, stable way of representing a signal. Frames are used in error detection and correction and the design and analysis of filter banks and more generally in applied mathematics, computer science, and engineering.

Definition and motivation

Motivating example: computing a basis from a linearly dependent set 
Suppose we have a set of vectors  in the vector space V and we want to express an arbitrary element  as a linear combination of the vectors , that is, we want to find coefficients  such that

If the set  does not span , then such coefficients do not exist for every such . If, however,  spans  but is not linearly independent, the question of how to determine the coefficients becomes less apparent, in particular if  is of infinite dimension.

Given that  spans  and is linearly dependent, one strategy is to remove vectors from the set until it becomes linearly independent and forms a basis.  There are some problems with this plan:

 Removing arbitrary vectors from the set may cause it to be unable to span  before it becomes linearly independent.
 Even if it is possible to devise a specific way to remove vectors from the set until it becomes a basis, this approach may become unfeasible in practice if the set is large or infinite.
 In some applications, it may be an advantage to use more vectors than necessary to represent .

Formal definition 
These vectors satisfy the frame condition if there are positive real numbers A and B such that  and for each  in V,
 
A set of vectors that satisfies the frame condition is a frame for the vector space.

The numbers A and B are called the lower and upper frame bounds, respectively. The frame bounds are not unique because numbers less than A and greater than B are also valid frame bounds. The optimal lower bound is the supremum of all lower bounds and the optimal upper bound is the infimum of all upper bounds.

A frame is called overcomplete (or redundant) if it is not a basis for the vector space.

Analysis operator 
The operator mapping  to a sequence of coefficients  is called the analysis operator of the frame. It is defined by:
 
By using this definition we may rewrite the frame condition as
 

Synthesis operator 
The adjoint operator  of the analysis operator is called the synthesis operator of the frame.

Motivation for the lower frame bound 
We want that any vector  can be reconstructed from the coefficients . This is satisfied if there exists a constant  such that for all  we have:

By setting  and applying the linearity of the analysis operator we get that this condition is equivalent to:

for all  which is exactly the lower frame bound condition.

History 
Because of the various mathematical components surrounding frames, frame theory has roots in harmonic and functional analysis, operator theory, linear algebra, and matrix theory.

The Fourier transform has been used for over a century as a way of decomposing and expanding signals. However, the Fourier transform masks key information regarding the moment of emission and the duration of a signal.  In 1946, Dennis Gabor was able to solve this using a technique that simultaneously reduced noise, provided resiliency, and created quantization while encapsulating important signal characteristics. This discovery marked the first concerted effort towards frame theory.

The frame condition was first described by Richard Duffin and Albert Charles Schaeffer in a 1952 article on nonharmonic Fourier series as a way of computing the coefficients in a linear combination of the vectors of a linearly dependent spanning set (in their terminology, a "Hilbert space frame"). In the 1980s, Stéphane Mallat, Ingrid Daubechies, and Yves Meyer used frames to analyze wavelets. Today frames are associated with wavelets, signal and image processing, and data compression.

Relation to bases 

A frame satisfies a generalization of Parseval's identity, namely the frame condition, while still maintaining norm equivalence between a signal and its sequence of coefficients.

If the set  is a frame of V, it spans V.  Otherwise there would exist at least one non-zero  which would be orthogonal to all .  If we insert  into the frame condition, we obtain

therefore , which is a violation of the initial assumptions on the lower frame bound.

If a set of vectors spans V, this is not a sufficient condition for calling the set a frame.  As an example, consider  with the dot product, and the infinite set  given by

This set spans V but since , we cannot choose a finite upper frame bound B.  Consequently, the set  is not a frame.

Applications 
In signal processing, each vector is interpreted as a signal. In this interpretation, a vector expressed as a linear combination of the frame vectors is a redundant signal. Using a frame, it is possible to create a simpler, more sparse representation of a signal as compared with a family of elementary signals (that is, representing a signal strictly with a set of linearly independent vectors may not always be the most compact form). Frames, therefore, provide robustness. Because they provide a way of producing the same vector within a space, signals can be encoded in various ways. This facilitates fault tolerance and resilience to a loss of signal.  Finally, redundancy can be used to mitigate noise, which is relevant to the restoration, enhancement, and reconstruction of signals.

In signal processing, it is common to assume the vector space is a Hilbert space.

Special cases

Tight frames 
A frame is a tight frame if A = B; in other words, the frame satisfies a generalized version of Parseval's identity. For example, the union of k disjoint orthonormal bases of a vector space is a tight frame with A = B = k. A tight frame is a Parseval frame (sometimes called a normalized frame) if A = B = 1. Each orthonormal basis is a Parseval frame, but the converse is not always true.

 
for all .

Equal norm frame 
A frame is an equal norm frame (sometimes called a  uniform frame or a normalized frame) if there is a constant c such that  for each i. An equal norm frame is a unit norm frame if c = 1. A Parseval (or tight) unit norm frame is an orthonormal basis; such a frame satisfies Parseval's identity.

Equiangular frames 
A frame is an equiangular frame if there is a constant c such that  for each distinct i and j.

Exact frames 
A frame is an exact frame if no proper subset of the frame spans the inner product space. Each basis for an inner product space is an exact frame for the space (so a basis is a special case of a frame).

Generalizations 

A Bessel Sequence is a set of vectors that satisfies only the upper bound of the frame condition.

Continuous frame 

Example
Given a discrete set  and a measure  where  is the Dirac measure then the continuous frame property

reduces to
.

and we see that continuous frames are indeed the natural generalization of the frames mentioned above.

Just like in the discrete case we can define the analysis, synthesis, and frame operators when dealing with continuous frames.

Continuous analysis operator
Given a continuous frame  the continuous analysis operator is the operator mapping  to a sequence of coefficients .

It is defined as follows:

Continuous synthesis operator
The adjoint operator of the continuous analysis operator is the continuous synthesis operator, which is the map

Continuous frame operator
The composition of the continuous analysis operator and the continuous synthesis operator is known as the continuous frame operator. For a continuous frame , it is defined as follows:

Continuous dual frame
Given a continuous frame , and another continuous frame , then   is said to be a continuous dual frame of  if it satisfies the following condition for all :

 .

Dual frames 

The frame condition entails the existence of a set of dual frame vectors  with the property that

for any   This implies that a frame together with its dual frame has the same property as a basis and its dual basis in terms of reconstructing a vector from scalar products.

In order to construct a dual frame, we first need the linear mapping  called the frame operator, defined as
 

 
which, when substituted in the frame condition inequality, yields
 
for each 

The frame operator  is self-adjoint, positive definite, and has positive upper and lower bounds. The inverse  of  exists and it, too, is self-adjoint, positive definite, and has positive upper and lower bounds.

The dual frame is defined by mapping each element of the frame with :

Thus

which proves that

Alternatively, we can let

which shows that

The numbers  are called frame coefficients. This derivation of a dual frame is a summary of Section 3 in the article by Duffin and Schaeffer.  They use the term conjugate frame for what here is called a dual frame.

The dual frame  is called the canonical dual of  because it acts similarly as a dual basis to a basis.

That is, there are different choices of coefficients  such that  This allows us some freedom for the choice of coefficients  other than  It is necessary that the frame  is overcomplete for other such coefficients  to exist. If so, then there exist frames  for which 

for all  We call  a dual frame of 

Canonical duality is a reciprocity relation, i.e. if the frame  is the canonical dual frame of  then  is the canonical dual frame of

See also 
 k-frame
 Biorthogonal wavelet
 Orthogonal wavelet
 Restricted isometry property
 Schauder basis 
 Harmonic analysis
 Fourier analysis
 Functional analysis

Notes

References 

 
 
 
 
 
 

Linear algebra
Differential geometry
Signal processing